Northop Hall Girls FC is a girls only football club based in Northop Hall, Flintshire in North Wales. The club's senior women's team joined the top level Welsh Premier League in 2011–12. The club withdrew from the league midway in the 2013/14 season because of a lack of players, but are now playing in the North Wales league again.

History
Northop Hall Girls FC was formed in 2008. Northop Hall Girls FC play in the North Wales Girls Football League and play their matches along the North Wales Coast, from Aston Park to Pwllheli.

Achievements
The team has won the Tesco Cup and both league and cup honours. It is one of the only "female only" Football Clubs in Wales that provide a continuous pathway in Football where a seven-year-old can progress all the way through to Ladies Open Age.

For season 2015–16 the club has teams at the following age groups: U8, U10, U11, U12, U14, U16 and Ladies open age. Over 100 girls and ladies are members of the club.

Honours
North Wales Girls League
u10 cup runners up 2008–09, 2013–14
u13 League Winners 2008–09
u14 North Wales Coast u14 cup winners 2008–09
u15 league runners up 2008–09
u15 cup runners up 2008–9
u17 league runners up 2008–09
u17 cup runners up 2008–09
u10 Shield winners 2009–10
u16 League winners 2009–10
u16 League winners 2009–10
u16 FAW u16 girls cup runners up 2009–10
u18 League winners 2009–10
u18 Cup winners 2009–10
Ladies cup runners up 2009–10

References

External links
 Northop Hall Girls FC official club website
 North Wales Girls Football League

Football clubs in Wales
Sport in Flintshire
Association football clubs established in 2008
Women's football clubs in Wales
2008 establishments in Wales
Mold, Flintshire